Ouville-la-Rivière is a commune in the Seine-Maritime department in the Normandy region in north-western France.

Geography

Population

Places of interest
 A yew tree nearly 1000 years old.
 The eighteenth-century château de Tous les Mesnils, open to visitors on weekend afternoons in the summer.
 The manorhouse du Tessy, now a guesthouse.
 The château d'Ouville, damaged during World War II, and not yet completely rebuilt.
 The church of St. Gilles, dating from the eleventh century.
 A sixteenth-century stone cross.

See also
 Communes of the Seine-Maritime department

References

Communes of Seine-Maritime